The Hangang Bridge bombing was a demolition operation conducted by the South Korean Army to destroy the Hangang Bridge in Seoul, South Korea, on 28 June 1950, to delay the rapid North Korean advance towards the city.

On 25 June, North Korea invaded South Korea, sparking the Korean War. Against a lightly armed and poorly equipped South Korean military, the North Korean assault forces and supporting tanks easily overwhelmed their defenses and within two days were positioned extremely close to Seoul. 

In the early morning of 27 June, Syngman Rhee had himself evacuated away from Seoul by his special train with several other South Korean government officials, despite informing his country on the previous day (26 June) of the decision by him and his government cabinet to remain behind in the capital city even with the looming threat of a North Korean attack on it. At 11:00 am, the South Korean Army headquarters decided to destroy the Hangang Bridge to stop the North Korean invasion and gave up defending Seoul. From noon to 3:30 pm on 27 June, the South Korean Army planted 3,600 pounds of TNT at the Hangang Bridge in preparation for its demolition. At 11:30pm, the demolition warning-order was issued.
However, the South Korean Army failed to announce the approaching demolition to Seoul residents.

On 28 June, at 2:30 am, the demolition charges were detonated without warning. On the bridge were some 4,000 refugees crossing the river when it was demolished and between 500 and 1,000 refugees were killed with the bridge's collapse. The South Korean government said 800 people died in the blast. The South Korean Army's Fifth Division was also cut off from its retreat path, leaving it stranded on the north bank of the Han River and at the mercy of the oncoming North Korean forces. At 11:00 am, the North Korean Army then reached the bridge, and shortly after crossing the river, successfully occupied Seoul.

The military engineer responsible for the bridge, Colonel Choi Chang-sik, was court-martialed for misbehavior before the enemy. He was found guilty and sentenced to death. Chang-sik was executed by firing squad on 21 September 1950. In 1964, Choi's wife pleaded his innocence to an appeal tribunal and the court found Choi as not guilty because the demolition order was issued by his superior officers.

On 28 June 2007, the first memorial service was held by a local veterans' peace association.

See also
First Battle of Seoul

References

War crimes in South Korea
Mass murder in 1950
South Korean war crimes
1950 murders in South Korea
Military scandals
Korean War crimes
Bridge disasters in South Korea
Bridge disasters caused by warfare
1950 in South Korea
1950s in Seoul
Explosions in South Korea
Massacres committed by South Korea
June 1950 events in Asia
Massacres in South Korea
Massacres in 1950
Battles and operations of the Korean War in 1950 
Battles of the Korean War involving South Korea